Ngalba Bulal is a national park in the Shire of Cook, Queensland, Australia. In 2015, Cedar Bay National Park became the  Mangkalba (Cedar Bay) section of the Ngalba Bulal National Park.

Geography 
The park is one of the Wet Tropics World Heritage Area series of national parks, and is a gazetted World Heritage Site. It is also known as Mangkal-Mangkalba in the dialect of the local Aboriginal population, the Eastern Kuku Yalanji.

History
The Cedar Bay area was developed in the 1870s for tin mining, and the remains of the tin work can still be seen in the area of Black Snake Rocks.

Cedar Bay gained a degree of notoriety in the 1970s when the Bjelke-Petersen government destroyed a hippie commune that was present. The raid was controversial because of the immense cost ($50,000) and use of a helicopter, light aircraft and a Navy vessel to arrest 12 people on drug and vagrancy charges. At the Cedar Bay inquiry, police were accused of burning huts, smashing personal belongings, destroying clothing, chopping down fruit plantations and, ironically, consuming alcohol at the site following the drug raid. Police, in their defence, tendered evidence of squalid living conditions and described the commune’s inhabitants as “filthy, criminal hippies”.

The handover came as a result of a 1994 Native Title claim.

Cedar Bay National Park was known as Mount Finnigan National Park before being enlarged.

Activities
The park contains some of the northernmost tropical rainforests in Australia. Birdwatching is a popular activity with the most common birds including cassowaries, yellow-breasted sunbirds, double-eyed fig-parrots, mangrove kingfishers, beach stone-curlews and pied imperial-pigeons. Bush camping is permitted in the park, however fishing and collecting are prohibited. The sole walking track in the park was a former donkey track used by tin miners. It is inaccessible to all but fit walkers.

See also

 Protected areas of Queensland

References

National parks of Far North Queensland
Protected areas established in 1977
Bays of Queensland
Wet Tropics of Queensland
1977 establishments in Australia